UFC Fight Night: Edwards vs. Muhammad (also known as  UFC Fight Night 187, UFC on ESPN+ 45 and UFC Vegas 21) was a mixed martial arts event produced by the Ultimate Fighting Championship that took place on March 13, 2021 at the UFC Apex facility in Enterprise, Nevada, part of the Las Vegas Metropolitan Area, United States.

Background 
A welterweight bout between Leon Edwards and Khamzat Chimaev was expected to serve as the main event. The pairing has been scheduled as headliner and cancelled on two previous occasions due to COVID-19 related issues affecting both fighters. First at UFC Fight Night: Thompson vs. Neal in December 2020, and again at UFC on ESPN: Chiesa vs. Magny in January 2021. On February 11, the fight was cancelled a third time as it was announced that Chimaev was still suffering from lingering effects of COVID-19 and pulled out of the fight. Edwards faced Belal Muhammad instead.

A bantamweight bout between Irwin Rivera and Ray Rodriguez was scheduled for the event. However, on January 7, news surfaced that Rivera was arrested for two counts of attempted murder in Palm Beach County, Florida after he allegedly stabbed his two sisters. He is currently being held in the Palm Beach County jail without bail. He was replaced by Rani Yahya.

Tagir Ulanbekov and returning veteran Matheus Nicolau were expected to meet in a flyweight bout at UFC 257, but Ulanbekov withdrew in late December due to undisclosed reasons. The pairing was eventually rescheduled for this event.  However, Ulanbekov pulled out once again and was replaced by former Rizin FF Bantamweight Champion Manel Kape.

A heavyweight bout between Jairzinho Rozenstruik and Ciryl Gane was originally scheduled for this event. However, they were moved to headline UFC Fight Night: Rozenstruik vs. Gane after the original main event between former UFC Light Heavyweight Championship challenger Dominick Reyes and former Rizin Light Heavyweight Champion Jiří Procházka was cancelled due to undisclosed reasons.

Guram Kutateladze was expected to face Don Madge in a lightweight bout at the event. However, Kutateladze pulled out in early February due to a knee injury. He was replaced by Nasrat Haqparast. In turn, Madge pulled out on March 6 due to visa issues. Haqparast eventually faced promotional newcomer Rafa García.

The Ultimate Fighter: Team McGregor vs. Team Faber lightweight winner Ryan Hall was expected to face Dan Ige in a featherweight bout at the event. However, Hall pulled out of the fight on February 11 due to undisclosed reasons. Ige faced Gavin Tucker instead.

Misha Cirkunov was expected to face Ryan Spann in a light heavyweight bout at UFC Fight Night: Thompson vs. Neal. However, Cirkunov pulled out due to an injury. The fight took place at this event.

Charles Jourdain was expected to face Steve Garcia in a featherweight bout at the event. However, Garcia withdrew from the fight for unknown reasons and was replaced by Marcelo Rojo.

A women's strawweight rematch between former Invicta FC Strawweight Champion Angela Hill and Ashley Yoder was expected to take place at UFC Fight Night: Rozenstruik vs. Gane. The two met before at The Ultimate Fighter: Redemption Finale in July 2017, with Hill winning via unanimous decision. Their second meeting was postponed on the day of that event, as it was announced that one of Yoder's cornermen tested positive for COVID-19. The bout took place at this card.

A featherweight bout between Ricardo Ramos and Zubaira Tukhugov was expected to take place during the preliminary portion of the event. A week before the event, Tukhugov pulled out due to undisclosed reasons. Promotion officials elected to remove Ramos from the card entirely and he will be rescheduled for a future event.

A heavyweight bout between Ben Rothwell and Philipe Lins was expected to take place at the event. However, during the week leading up to the event the bout was removed from the card due to undisclosed reasons. The pairing is expected to remain intact and rescheduled for UFC on ESPN: Rodriguez vs. Waterson.

Results

Bonus awards
The following fighters received $50,000 bonuses.
Fight of the Night: No bonus awarded.
Performance of the Night: Ryan Spann, Dan Ige, Davey Grant and Matthew Semelsberger

See also 

 List of UFC events
 List of current UFC fighters
 2021 in UFC

References 

UFC Fight Night
2021 in mixed martial arts
2021 in sports in Nevada
Mixed martial arts in Las Vegas
Sports competitions in Las Vegas
March 2021 sports events in the United States